The following is a list of NCAA Division I men's basketball conference tournament champions.


1924
Colorado d. Washington 2–0 in a best of three series - Pacific Coast.

BYU d. Colorado College 2–1 in a best of three series - Rocky Mountain.

North Carolina d. Alabama 26-18 - Southern.

1925

1926

1927

1928

1929

1930

1931

1932

1933

1934

1935

1936

1937

1938

1939

1940

1941

1942

1943

1944

1945

1946

1947

1948

1949

1950

1951

1952

1953

1954

1955

1956

1957

1958

1959

1960

1961

1962

1963

1964

1965

1966

1967

1968

1969

1970

1971

1972

1973

1974

1975

1976

1977

1978

1979

1980

1981

1982

1983

1984

1985

1986

1987

1988

1989

1990

1991

1992

1993

1994

1995

1996

1997

1998

1999

2000

2001

2002

2003

2004

2005

2006

2007

2008

2009
All winning schools played in the NCAA Tournament. If a conference's regular-season champion played in its tournament final, it will be indicated by italics.

See also
 List of NCAA Division I men's basketball champions